Calamotropha kurenzovi is a moth in the family Crambidae. It was described by Valentina A. Kirpichnikova in 1982. It is found in Primorsky Krai in the Russian Far East.

References

Crambinae
Moths described in 1982